Super Sleuth Christmas Movie is a 2007 Christmas-themed featurette directed by Don MacKinnon and David Hartman and based on the Playhouse Disney television series My Friends Tigger & Pooh. The first in the series, the film was released direct-to-video on November 20, 2007. It premiered on Playhouse Disney on December 6, 2008.

Plot
One December, Darby and Buster are spending the evening at Winnie the Pooh's house with their friends from the Hundred Acre Wood.

Playing outside, Roo and Lumpy the Heffalump find a red sack, and a reindeer named Holly stuck in a thicket patch. Holly explains that she is one of Santa's reindeer, and she's looking for Santa Claus' magical sack after it fell off of his sleigh during a practice run. Roo and Lumpy have the sack, but Holly doesn't know how to get home.

All of the friends set off towards the North Pole. After some difficulties, including the loss of Tigger's mask, the group considers giving up, but Darby convinces them to keep going. They discover giant snowmen, who come to life and open the path to the North Pole. They return the sack to Santa, and he takes them all out in his sleigh to deliver presents. Santa brings the friends home in time to celebrate Christmas at Pooh's house.

Cast (US Dub)
 Chloë Grace Moretz as Darby
 Dee Bradley Baker as Buster and Frost
 Jim Cummings as Winnie-the-Pooh and Tigger
 Travis Oates as Piglet
 Peter Cullen as Eeyore
 Ken Sansom as Rabbit
 Kath Soucie as Kanga
 Max Burkholder as Roo
 Oliver Dillon as Lumpy the Heffalump
 Jeffrey Tambor as Santa Claus
 Mikaila Baumel as Holly
 Tara Strong as Vixen

Cast (UK Dub)
 Kimberlea Berg as Darby

See also 
 List of Christmas films

References

External links
 Super Sleuth Christmas Movie IMDB

2007 films
2007 animated films
Winnie-the-Pooh featurettes
American Christmas films
American sequel films
American animated featurettes
Animated Christmas films
Winnie the Pooh (franchise)
2000s Christmas films
Films scored by Andy Sturmer
Disney Television Animation films
Santa Claus in film
Films set in the Arctic
Santa Claus's reindeer
Films about deer and moose
2000s English-language films
2000s American films